The Puerto Rico national basketball team represents Puerto Rico in men's international basketball competitions, it is governed by the Puerto Rican Basketball Federation, The team represents both FIBA and FIBA Americas.

Since joining FIBA in 1957, the Puerto Rican national team has been mostly composed by Puerto Rican-born players and players of Puerto Rican descent born in the United States such as Raymond Gause, Rick Apodaca, Georgie Torres, Héctor Blondet, Renaldo Balkman, Ramón Clemente, Maurice Harkless, Tyler Davis and many others.

History
The Puerto Rican Basketball Federation joined FIBA in 1957. Puerto Rico has participated in nine Olympics and 12 World Championships, although they have never won a medal at either competition.

Early years
Puerto Rico's first appearance at a World Championship was in 1959 in Chile, where, led by Juan Vicéns, who averaged 22 points per game, the team finished 5th with a record of 3–6. In 1963, at Puerto Rico's second World Championship appearance which took place in Brazil, the team, led by Rafael Valle and Juan Vicéns, opened the tournament winning two straight games. Yet, after losing other six games back to back, ended its participation with a win over Italy, obtaining the 6th place.

Coming back from its 13th place debut at the 1960 Olympics in Rome, in 1964 in Tokyo, the team was able to reach 4th place, in good part because of the contributions of point guard Juan Vicéns. This was, and still is as of 2016, the highest place it has ever reached since the team's birth at any Olympic Games. Three years later in Uruguay, at the 1967 World Championship, the team, led this time by Raymond Dalmau, was only able to finish 12th, ending the decade with a 9th place at the 1968 Olympics in Mexico City.

Before the 1970s, regardless of the non-remarkable performance at world international tournaments, Puerto Rico started to emerge as a power player at regional tournaments, medaling in all the competitions it participated (the Pan American Games, the CentroBasket tournament and the Central American and Caribbean Games). The medal count included two golds at the 1962 and the 1966 Central American and Caribbean Games, failing to medal only at the 1967 Pan American Games, where it finished 5th.

1970s
The 1970s brought some memorable moments for the team, particularly a dramatic one-point loss to the United States at the 1976 Olympics in Montreal, where a win by Puerto Rico would have been the first undisputed basketball loss for the United States team at an Olympic competition. Also, the 1974 World Championship and the 1979 Pan American Games were held in San Juan, promoting local enthusiasm for international basketball and Puerto Rico's presence in it. The 7th and 10th places at the 1974 and 1978 World Championships, where the team, led by Hector Blondet and Rubén Rodríguez respectively, saw 2–5 and 4–3 finishes, became turning points for the Puerto Rican team. The 4–3 showing in 1978 in the Philippines was the first time ever the team finished with a positive record at a World Championship. These achievements were accompanied by golds at the 1973 CentroBasket and the 1978 Central American and Caribbean Games. In all, Puerto Rico continued its regional success and was able to medal in all regional competitions.

1980s
The 1980s were very good for the team, attaining gold at two of the first four FIBA Americas Championships in 1980 and 1989, and at the 1985, 1987 and 1989 CentroBasket tournaments. The silver medal at the 1988 Americas Championship held in Montevideo, Uruguay, secured the team's first Olympic participation since 1976. Having qualified and earned the right to participate, the Puerto Rican team chose not to do so at the 1980 Olympic Games, held in Moscow, due to the American boycott of that competition (being an autonomous nation sportswise, the team could have participated, but decided to respect the boycott instead). It wouldn't participate either at the 1984 Olympic Games, held in Los Angeles, because the team failed to qualify for it. Twelve years after its last Olympic showing, Puerto Rico was able to advance to the second round and finished 7th at the 1988 Olympic Games, held in Seoul. Two years earlier, at the 1986 World Championshipat in Spain, Puerto Rico's performance granted it the 10th place, having failed to qualify for the 1982 Championship in Colombia.

1990s
During the 1990s, the team's successes continued as usual. Led by José Ortiz, Ramón Rivas, Jerome Mincy, Fico López, and Edgar León. the decade began with a 4th-place finish at the 1990 World Championship in Argentina. This is Puerto Rico's best showing at a World Championship so far, defeating teams such as Yugoslavia, Argentina and the United States, but losing to the USSR and then, losing by two points the rematch in overtime to the US. In 1991, led by Raymond Gause, besides earning gold at the CentroBasket tournament, the team also won, for the first time in basketball, the gold medal at the Pan American Games, which were held in Cuba. The team also qualified for the 1992 Olympics in Barcelona, where it reached the second round, losing to the US in its first game of the elimination round, finishing at the end in 8th place. In 1993, Puerto Rico signed its Caribbean supremacy at this sport by winning gold at both the CentroBasket and the Central American and Caribbean Games. This victory at CentroBasket was the last of a 5 gold medal streak at the tournament. In 1994, the team finished in a 6th place at the World Championship in Canada, but won the gold at the 1994 Goodwill Games in St. Petersburg, Russia, defeating teams such as Croatia, Russia, Brazil and Italy. It was then when Puerto Rico began to be classified as one of the top 10 international teams. Having won gold in 1995 at the FIBA Americas Pre-Olympic Championship, in 1996 at the Olympic Games, the team placed 10th in Atlanta, while in 1998, it placed 11th at the World Championship in Greece.

In 1994, Puerto Rico's national basketball team won the gold medal at the 1994 Goodwill Games in Russia, beating Italy, 94–80, in the gold medal game.

2000–2004
This Olympic cycle did not go well for the team at the International level, although it did have great moments and it performed well at the local level. Having failed to qualify for the 2000 Olympics in Sydney, Australia with its 4th place at the 1999 Tournament of the Americas hosted in San Juan, Puerto Rico, in 2001 the team was able to recover its CentroBasket title, with a triumph in Mexico. Later that year, the team repeated its 4th place at the 2001 FIBA Americas tournament in Argentina.

In 2002, the team had a strong showing at the World Championship held in Indianapolis, USA. The team beat the top 3 European teams at the time; eventual champion Yugoslavia, Turkey and Spain. Puerto Rico, with a 5–1 record entering the quarterfinals, lost its chance to get into the medals round only by a dramatic 2-points loss to New Zealand, eventually placing 7th. It is worth mentioning that Carlos Arroyo debuted at this tournament.

In 2003, the team also won gold at the CentroBasket tournament, held in Mexico, but was only able to achieve the bronze medal at the Tournament of the Americas and the Pan American Games. Reaching its 16th final at the CentroBasket tournament, Puerto Rico conquered the silver medal at the 2004 CentroBasket tournament, losing to the host Dominican Republic, 75–74, in the championship game.

On August 15, 2004, at the 2004 Summer Olympics in Athens, the Puerto Rico National Basketball Team became the second team in history to defeat the United States Olympic basketball team, recording only the third loss in an Olympic competition for the U.S. team, and the first since NBA players were allowed to compete. The 92–73 outcome of that game is, as of 2016, the most lopsided victory against the U.S. (collegiate or NBA players) in the history of Olympic basketball. The other team to defeat the U.S. had been the Soviet Union at the 1972 gold medal game (the outcome of which is still disputed) and the 1988 semifinals.

2005–2008
In 2005, Puerto Rico was invited to play at the 2005 Stanković Continental Champions' Cup in Beijing, where it lost all five games and ended up finishing in 6th place. Still, having failed to qualify directly to the 2006 World Championship by achieving a 7th place at the 2005 FIBA Americas Championship in Santo Domingo, due to its great tradition, in November 2005, Puerto Rico received an invitation to participate in the World tournament as a wildcard, along with Italy, Serbia and Montenegro and Turkey. En route to the World Championship, Puerto Rico won bronze at the 2006 CentroBasket, losing the automatic classification to the 2008 tournament, but recovering in time to earn gold at the 2006 Central American and Caribbean Games. Later, at the group play stage of the 2006 World Championship, which was contested in Japan, Puerto Rico started with victories over Senegal and China, but lost ties against the United States, Italy and Slovenia. The application of a second tiebreaker by points differential to Slovenia, China and Puerto Rico, each with a winning percentage of .400, placed Puerto Rico fifth in Group D, preventing the team from advancing to the knockout round for the first time since 1986; Puerto Rico ultimately placed 17th out of twenty-four, that being its shyest performance in a long time. The following year began with Puerto Rico earning its fifth silver medal at the 2007 Pan American Games, followed by the team's first participation in a CaribeBasket tournament, debuting against Trinidad & Tobago. Although the team didn't have the participation of Daniel Santiago or Rick Apodaca, Puerto Rico won the tournament undefeated, which meant its classification to the 2008 CentroBasket tournament. Later that year, Puerto Rico started to host an exhibition tournament called the Marchand Continental Championship Cup in order to prepare for the 2007 FIBA Americas Championship. After playing against Brazil, Canada and Argentina, Puerto Rico lost all three games, ending up in fourth place. The year ended with a bronze at the FIBA Americas Championship. On January 31, 2008, a draw took place for the FIBA Preolympic tournament, which placed Puerto Rico in the same group as Croatia and Cameroon, where its winner would have to face the second place of Group C. Following this event, the president of the National Superior Basketball League confirmed that the team would play exhibition games at the 2008 Bamberg Super Cup in Germany against Greece, Slovenia and the host, beginning on July 4, 2008. Then, a second set of exhibition games would follow, scheduled to start on July 8, 2008, in Slovenia: the 2008 Alpos International Cup, where the team would face New Zealand, Iran and the hosts. After these preparatory tournaments, the team would train until the Preolympic tournament's beginning. The team began practicing on May 19, 2008, and included several players that were under consideration for inclusion by Cintrón. On June 4, 2008, Daniel Santiago confirmed that he would abandon his international retirement and play with Puerto Rico in the Preolympic tournament. Santiago announced that he would join the team in July, following an exhibition game. Javier Mojica, Alejandro Carmona and Joel Jones were included in as potential members in the preliminary team. On July 1, 2008, hours before the team was scheduled to travel to Europe, Ángelo Reyes was excluded after not establishing communication with the directives. Reyes was replaced with Alex Falcón. Subsequently, Reyes asked for a dispensation to attend personal matters, noting that he intended to join the team in a week; however, he was not included due to time constraints. In the first game at the Bamberg Super Cup, Puerto Rico defeated Germany with a team composed mostly of reserve players, as Carlos Arroyo, Santiago, Larry Ayuso and Carmelo Lee were attending other compromises. Puerto Rico continued playing with these players, finishing 2nd, after losing the final game to Greece, who entered the cup with their entire lineup. Santiago and Ayuso joined the practices on July 5, 2008, when Puerto Rico traveled to Slovenia, where the Alpos International Cup was being held. The first match in the tournament was a victory against New Zealand, followed by another victory in the semifinals over Iran. At the end, Puerto Rico finished second, losing to Slovenia in the finals. The Preolympic tournament began on July 14, 2008, but Puerto Rico's debut came the following day, when the team defeated Cameroon and advanced to the second round, due to a loss that the African team had suffered during the first day of competition. On its second game, the team lost to Croatia, but in the quarterfinals, defeated Slovenia. The team didn't qualify to the Olympics, after losing to Greece in the semifinals and to Germany in the tournament's bronze medal game.

2008–2012
This Olympic cycle began with the 2008 CentroBasket competition. After having failed to classify directly to it, Puerto Rico's spot was secured after its first and only participation in the 2007 CaribeBasket tournament, where Puerto Rico won all round one games by over 25 points and went on to win gold. The 2008 Centrobasket was scheduled to take place before the Olympic Qualifying Tournament, but due to time constraints it was postponed. A group of prospects was included in the roster to replace Peter John Ramos and Ricky Sanchez, who were injured. Among those included was Ángel Daniel Vassallo, who played as a small forward in Virginia Tech. In the first game of the tournament, Puerto Rico defeated Costa Rica. In the other two games of the first round, the team defeated Cuba and Panama. During the course of the event, Carlos Arroyo and Larry Ayuso were forced to rest a game due to injuries. In the semifinals, the team scored a win over the Dominican Republic. Puerto Rico won the gold medal by defeating the United States Virgin Islands in the finals. The team has secured a spot for the 2010 FIBA World Championship by finishing in 1 of the top 4 spots in the 2009 FIBA Americas Championship. At the end, Puerto Rico finished the tournament with the silver medal, having lost the game against Argentina in the group stage, and losing the final against Brazil. Pending the performance at the 2010 FIBA World Championship, this cycle has had Puerto Rico with a record of 19–2 (Caribebasket 6–0, Centrobasket 5–0, FIBA Americas 8–2), not counting the 2nd-place finish at the 2009 Marchand Continental Championship Cup, where Puerto Rico won the exhibition games against Argentina and Canada, but lost the final to Brazil.

At the 2010 CentroBasket, Puerto Rico won Group B with Cuba finishing second. The team defeated Panama in semifinals and the Dominican Republic in the final to win the gold medal. Arroyo and Barea were included in the tournament's All-Star Team.

In 2010, the Puerto Rican Basketball Federation relieved Manolo Cintron of his coaching duties, and on June 8, 2011, the Federation officially announced the new head coach of the national team, Flor Melendez, which will be Melendez's second stint with the team as head coach.

On August 27, 2011, a chartered airplane carrying the team as well as the Canadian, Dominican and Brazilian national basketball teams from Foz de Iguacu, Brazil, to Mar del Plata, Argentina, made an emergency landing at Ezeiza International Airport, Buenos Aires, Argentina, after experiencing severe weather conditions mid-flight. The plane left for Mar del Plata an hour and a half after it landed.

2019 
On February 26, 2019, Puerto Rico defeated the Uruguayan national basketball team 65–61, securing their entrance into the 2019 FIBA Basketball World Cup in China They were drawn to Group C, facing 2nd-ranked Spain, alongside Iran and Tunisia, with Puerto Rico facing Iran and Tunisia for the very first time.

Uniform
During most of the 1980s and up until the late 1990s, the team wore a solid color uniform, with accent lines and the word "Puerto Rico" written in stylized cursive. Nowadays, the national team's uniform resembles a Puerto Rican flag, but also includes the traditional Puerto Rico letters in cursive. The uniforms are red or blue for "home" status, and white for "away."

Competitive record

Summer Olympics

FIBA World Cup

FIBA AmeriCup

Pan American Games

Since joining FIBA in 1957, Puerto Rico has participated in the basketball competition for all editions of the Pan American Games since 1959, obtaining medals in all but the 1967, 1983, 1995 and 2015 games. It has a total of 11 medals.

Centrobasket

Puerto Rico has a great record at the Centrobasket Championships, having participated in all of them but 1967, and obtaining a medal in all.

Central American and Caribbean Games

Since its basketball debut in the 1935 Games, Puerto Rico has only failed to medal in the 1938, 1946, 1950, and 1998 Games. The team has a total of 16 medals.

CaribeBasket Championships

Since the founding of the CaribeBasket tournament in 1981 as a CentroBasket qualification stage for Caribbean countries, Puerto Rico has only participated in the 2007 tournament, after failing to classify directly to CentroBasket 2008. In this tournament, it won all round one games by over 25 points and went on to win gold.

Goodwill Games

Because the 1986 FIBA World Championship was scheduled to be held at the same time as the 1986 Goodwill Games, the inaugural men's Goodwill Games basketball title was based on results from the World's. For the 2001 games, although scheduled to compete with seven other teams, Puerto Rico was not able to make it to the tournament, being replaced by Mexico, which finished 7th.

FIBA World Olympic Qualifying Tournament

Marchand Continental Championship Cup

Other international events

Record against other teams at the World Cup

Last updated: September 4, 2019

Results and fixtures

2021

2022

Team

Current roster
Roster for the 2022 FIBA AmeriCup.

Depth chart
Based on the recent call-ups and selections:

Retired numbers

Head coach position
  Víctor Mario Pérez (1959)
  Howie Shannon (1960–1963)
  José Garrige (1963)
  Lou Rossini (1964–1967)
  Fufi Santori (1967)
  Lou Rossini (1968–1972)
  Gene Bartow (1972–1974)
  Armando Torres (1974–1976)
  Tom Nissalke (1976–1978)
  Víctor Ojeda (1978–1986)
  Ángel Cancel (1986–1988)
  Armando Torres Ortiz (1988–1990)
  Raymond Dalmau (1990–1994)
  Carlos Morales (1994–2002)
  Julio Toro (2002–2006)
  Manolo Cintrón (2010–2011)
  Flor Meléndez (2011–2013)
  Paco Olmos (2013–2014)
  Rick Pitino (2015)
  Eddie Casiano (2016–2021)
  Omar González (2019; Pan American Games)
  Nelson Colón (2021–present)

Past rosters
1959 World Championship
 Alfonso Lastra
 Juan "Pachin" Vicens
 Juan Ramon "Johnny" Baez
 Jose Angel Cestero
 Johnny Rodriguez
 Evelio Droz
 John Morales
 Jose Antonio Casillas
 Martin Jimenez
 Jose A. Ruano
 Salvador Dijols (Coach: Victor Mario Perez)

1960 Summer Olympic Games
 Juan "Pachin" Vicens
 Teofilo "Teo" Cruz
 Evelio Droz
 Juan Ramon "Johnny" Baez
 Jose Angel Cestero
 Jose Antonio Casillas
 Johnny Rodriguez
 Rafael Valle
 Jose Santori
 Angel Cancel
 John Morales
 Cesar Bocachica (Coach: Howie Shannon)

1963 World Championship
 Juan "Pachin" Vicens
 Juan Ramon "Johnny" Baez
 Bill McCadney
 Rafael Valle
 Evelio Droz
 Salvador Dijols
 Eduardo Alvarez
 Cesar Bocachica
 Ramon Siragusa
 Tomas Gutierrez
 Angel Cancel
 Armando Torres (Coach: Jose Garrige)

1964 Summer Olympic Games
 Teofilo "Teo" Cruz
 Juan "Pachin" Vicens
 Bill McCadney
 Juan Ramon "Johnny" Baez
 Tomas Gutierrez
 Evelio Droz
 Ruben Adorno
 Angel Cancel
 Martin Anza
 Alberto Zamot
 Jaime Frontera
 Angel Garcia (Coach: Lou Rossini)

1967 World Championship
 Raymond Dalmau
 Bill McCadney
 Tomas Gutierrez
 Angel Cancel
 Rafael Rivera
 Gustavo Mattei
 Francisco Cordova
 Mariano Ortiz
 Alberto Zamot
 Victor Cuevas
 Adolfo Porrata
 Richard Pietri (Coach: Jose Santori Coll)

1968 Summer Olympic Games
 Raymond Dalmau
 Teofilo "Teo" Cruz
 Bill McCadney
 Joe Hatton
 Ruben Adorno
 Alberto Zamot
 Angel Cancel
 Tomas Gutierrez
 Mariano Ortiz
 Francisco Cordova
 Jaime Frontera
 Adolfo Porrata (Coach: Lou Rossini)

1972 Summer Olympic Games
 Teofilo "Teo" Cruz
 Raymond Dalmau
 Hector Blondet
 Neftali Rivera
 Ruben Rodriguez
 Joe Hatton
 Mariano Ortiz
 Billy Baum
 Earl Brown
 Miguel Coll
 Jimmy Thordsen
 Ricardo Calzada (Coach: Gene Bartow)

1974 World Championship
 Teofilo "Teo" Cruz
 Raymond Dalmau
 Neftali Rivera
 Hector Blondet
 Ruben Rodriguez
 Jimmy Thordsen
 Mariano Ortiz
 Michael Vicens
 Ruben Montanez
 Carlos Bermudez
 Jose Pacheco
 Luis Brignoni (Coach: Armandito Torres Ortiz)

1976 Summer Olympic Games
 Teofilo "Teo" Cruz
 Raymond Dalmau
 Neftali Rivera
 Earl Brown
 Hector Blondet
 Jimmy Thordsen
 Mariano Ortiz
 Michael Vicens
 Roberto "Bobby" Alvarez
 Alfred Lee
 Ruben Rodriguez
 Luis Brignoni (Coach: Tom Nissalke)

1978 World Championship
 Raymond Dalmau
 Neftali Rivera
 Ruben Rodriguez
 Angel "Cachorro" Santiago
 Steven Sewell
 Hector Olivencia, Willie Quinones
 Georgie Torres
 Carlos Bermudez
 Mario Morales
 J. Villet
 O. Rodriguez (Coach: Victor Ojeda)

1986 World Championship
 Federico "Fico" Lopez
 Ramon Rivas
 Jerome Mincy
 Angelo Cruz
 Felix Rivera
 Edgar de Leon
 Wesley Correa
 Jose Sosa
 Orlando Febres
 Frankie Torruellas
 Mario Morales
 Francisco de Leon (Coach: Angel Cancel)

1988 Summer Olympic Games
 Federico "Fico" Lopez
 Jose "Piculin" Ortiz
 Ramon Ramos
 Jerome Mincy
 Ramon Rivas
 Angelo Cruz
 Edgar de Leon
 Mario Morales
 Roberto Rios
 Francisco de Leon
 Raymond Gausse
 Vicente Ithier (Coach: Armandito Torres Ortiz)

1990 World Championship
 Federico "Fico" Lopez
 Jose "Piculin" Ortiz
 Ramon Rivas
 Jerome Mincy
 Angelo Cruz
 Edgar de Leon
 James Carter
 Francisco de Leon
 Georgie Torres
 Raymond Gausse
 Jose Agosto
 Orlando Marrero (Coach: Raymond Dalmau)

1992 Summer Olympic Games
 Jose "Piculin" Ortiz
 Federico "Fico" Lopez
 Eddie Casiano
 Ramon Rivas
 Jerome Mincy
 Edgar de Leon
 James Carter
 Mario Morales
 Richard Soto
 Raymond Gausse
 Edwin Pellot
 Javier Antonio Colon (Coach: Raymond Dalmau)

1994 World Championship
 Jose "Piculin" Ortiz
 Federico "Fico" Lopez
 Eddie Casiano
 Edgar de Leon
 Jerome Mincy
 James Carter
 Orlando Vega
 Felix Perez
 Ruben Colon
 Dean Borges
 Javier Colon
 Luis Ramon Allende (Coach: Carlos Morales)

1996 Summer Olympic Games
 Jose "Piculin" Ortiz
 Ramon Rivas
 Daniel Santiago
 Pablo Alicea
 Edgar Padilla
 Jerome Mincy
 Richard Soto
 Heriberto "Eddie" Rivera
 George "Georgie" Torres
 Carmelo Travieso
 Eugenio Soto
 Luis Joel Curbelo (Coach: Carlos Morales)

1998 World Championship
 Jose "Piculin" Ortiz
 Eddie Casiano
 Orlando Vèga
 Daniel Santiago
 Jerome Mincy
 James Carter
 Eugenio Soto
 Edgar de Leon
 Carmelo Travieso
 Eddin Santiago
 Javier Colon
 Rolando Hourruitiner (Coach: Carlos Morales)

2002 World Championship
 Carlos Arroyo
 Elias "Larry" Ayuso
 Daniel Santiago
 Jose "Piculin" Ortiz
 Rick Apodaca
 Jerome Mincy
 Christian Dalmau
 Raymond "Richie" Dalmau
 Rolando Hourruitiner
 Luis Ramon Allende
 Antonio Latimer
 Felix Javier Perez (Coach: Julio Toro)

2004 Summer Olympic Games
 Carlos Arroyo
 Elias "Larry" Ayuso
 Jose "Piculin" Ortiz
 Daniel Santiago
 Eddie Casiano
 Rick Apodaca
 Christian Dalmau
 Sharif Karim Fajardo
 Peter John Ramos
 Roberto Jose "Bobby Joe" Hatton
 Rolando Hourruitiner
 Jorge Luis Rivera (Coach: Julio Toro)

2006 World Championship
 Carlos Arroyo
 David Huertas
 Daniel Santiago
 Rick Apodaca
 Guillermo Díaz
 Peter John Ramos
 Roberto Jose "Bobby Joe" Hatton
 Antonio "Puruco" Latimer
 Carmelo Antrone Lee
 Filiberto Isaac Rivera
 Manuel Antonio Narvaez
 Angelo Luis Reyes (Coach: Julio Toro)

See also

Puerto Rico women's national basketball team

References

External links

 
 FIBA Profile
 Gallery of Pictures of Puerto Rican players at enciclopediapr.org

Men's national basketball teams